The women's heptathlon event at the 1999 Summer Universiade was held at the Estadio Son Moix in Palma de Mallorca, Spain on 9 and 10.

Results

References

Results

Athletics at the 1999 Summer Universiade
1999 in women's athletics
1999